Mighty Aphrodite is a 1995 American comedy film written, directed by, and co-starring Woody Allen, alongside Mira Sorvino, Helena Bonham Carter, Michael Rapaport, and F. Murray Abraham. The screenplay was vaguely inspired by the story of Pygmalion and is about Lenny Weinrib's (Allen) search for his genius adopted son's biological mother, ultimately finding that she is a dim-witted prostitute named Linda Ash (Sorvino).

While critical reception of Mighty Aphrodite overall was mildly positive, Sorvino was highly praised for her performance, earning several accolades such as the Academy Award for Best Supporting Actress, as well as a Golden Globe Award, New York Film Critics Circle Award, Critics' Choice Movie Award, National Board of Review Award, and a Dallas–Fort Worth Film Critics Association Award.

Plot
The film opens on ancient Greek ruins where a chanting Greek chorus introduces and narrates the story of Lenny Weinrib. Lenny is a sportswriter in Manhattan, married to ambitious curator Amanda. The couple decide to adopt a baby, a boy they name Max. Lenny is awed by their son who, it becomes increasingly clear, is a gifted child.

Lenny becomes obsessed with learning the identity of Max's biological mother. After a long search, Lenny is disturbed to find that she is a prostitute and part-time porn star who uses several names but confesses her birth name is Leslie Ash, and she likes "Linda" because it means “beautiful” in Spanish. Lenny makes an "appointment" to see her at her apartment. Linda is a bit of a ditz with a crude sense of humor and delusions of becoming a stage actress. Lenny does not have intercourse with her but instead urges her to get away from prostitution and start a wholesome life. Linda becomes angry, refunds Lenny's money, and forces him to leave. Lenny, however, is determined to befriend her and improve her life. He first manages to get Linda away from her violent pimp and then attempts to pair Linda with a former boxer, Kevin. They appear to be a well-suited couple until Kevin discovers Linda's background.

Meanwhile, Lenny and Amanda have been drifting apart, due to Lenny's obsession with Linda, but also Amanda's career and her affair with her colleague Jerry. Amanda tells Lenny she wants to explore her relationship with Jerry. Lenny and Linda console each other over their break-ups, and end up finally engaging in intercourse. However, the next day Lenny reconciles with Amanda, and they realize that they are still in love. Linda tries unsuccessfully to get back with Kevin but on the drive back to Manhattan, she sees a helicopter dropping out of the sky. She pulls over and gives the pilot, Don, a ride. It is revealed by the Greek chorus that they will end up married, although Linda is now pregnant with Lenny's child.

About a year later, Linda (with her infant daughter) and Lenny (with Max) meet in a toy store. They both have each other's children but do not realize it. Linda thanks Lenny for everything he did to help her and then leaves Lenny dumbstruck. The film ends with the Greek chorus singing and dancing.

Cast
 Woody Allen as Lenny Weinrib
 Mira Sorvino as Linda Ash
 Helena Bonham Carter as Amanda Sloan Weinrib
 Michael Rapaport as Kevin
 F. Murray Abraham as Greek Chorus Leader
 Olympia Dukakis as Jocasta
 David Ogden Stiers as Laius
 Jack Warden as Tiresias
 Danielle Ferland as Cassandra
 Peter Weller as Jerry Bender
 Claire Bloom as Mrs. Sloan
 Paul Herman as Rick's Friend
 Paul Giamatti as Extras Guild Researcher
 Sondra James as The Chorus Voices

Production
Dick Hyman served as the film's music coordinator, arranger, and conductor. The soundtrack includes "Neo Minore" performed by Vassilis Tsitsanis, "Horos Tou Sakena" by Stavros Xarchakos, "I've Found a New Baby" by Wilbur de Paris, "Whispering" by Benny Goodman & His Orchestra, "Manhattan" by Carmen Cavallaro, "When Your Lover Has Gone" by Ambrose & His Orchestra, "L'il Darlin" by Count Basie & His Orchestra, "Take Five" by the Dave Brubeck Quartet, "Penthouse Serenade (When We're Alone)" and "I Hadn't Anyone Till You" by Erroll Garner, "The In Crowd" by Ramsey Lewis, and "You Do Something to Me" and "When You're Smiling" by the Dick Hyman Chorus & Orchestra. Graciela Daniele choreographed the dance routines.

The Greek chorus includes George de la Peña and Pamela Blair. Tony Sirico and Paul Giamatti make brief appearances in minor roles.

Manhattan locations include Bowling Green, Central Park, and FAO Schwarz. Additional exteriors were filmed in North Tarrytown and Quogue. The Greek chorus scenes were filmed in the Teatro antico in Taormina on the island of Sicily.

Mira Sorvino mentioned in a 2011 interview that she chose Linda's voice to be high and gravelly since "high voice kind of makes you sound less intellectually gifted, and the gravelly part just added this kind of rough-and-tumble, been-to-the-school-of-hard-knocks element to it." Four weeks into the production, Allen spoke with Sorvino asking if she had ever wondered about using a different voice. Sorvino stated that the voice affected how she approached the character, and that if she changed the voice the character changed. When she pointed out that they were four weeks into the movie Allen said, "Oh, that doesn't matter. I have it written into my budget that I can reshoot the entire movie if I want."

In real life, Leonard "Lenny" Weinrib was the name of an American actor, voice actor, and writer known for playing the title role in the children's television show H.R. Pufnstuf. He died in 2006.

Soundtrack

 Neo Minore - Written and performed by Vasilis Tsitsanis
 Manhattan (1925) - Music by Richard Rodgers - Lyrics by Lorenz Hart - Performed by Carmen Cavallaro
 Penthouse Serenade (1952) - Written by Will Jason and Val Burton - Performed by Erroll Garner
 You Do Something to Me (1929) - Written by Cole Porter - Performed by Dick Hyman
 Take Five (1959) - Written by Paul Desmond - Performed by Dave Brubeck Quartet
 The 'In' Crowd (1965) - Written by Billy Page - Performed by Ramsey Lewis
 Li'l Darlin'(1957) - Written by Neal Hefti - Performed by Count Basie and His Orchestra
 FAO Schwarz Clock Tower Song - Written and Performed by Bobby Gosh
 Horos Tou Sakena - Written by Stavros Xarhakos - Featuring by Giorgos Zambetas
 Whispering (1919) - Music by Richard Coburn, Vincent Rose, John Schonberger - Performed by Benny Goodman and His Orchestra
 I've Found a New Baby (1926) - Written by Jack Palmer & Spencer Williams - Performed by Wilbur De Paris
 I Hadn't Anyone Till You (1938) - Written by Ray Noble - Performed by Erroll Garner
 When Your Lover Has Gone (1931) - Written by E.A. Swan - Performed by Bert Ambrose and His Orchestra
 Walkin' My Baby Back Home (1930) - Music by Fred E. Ahlert - Lyrics by Roy Turk - Performed by Dick Hyma
 When You're Smiling (1928) - Written by Mark Fisher, Joe Goodwin & Larry Shay - Performed by Dick Hyman

Release
Mighty Aphrodite debuted at the Toronto International Film Festival before going into limited release in the United States. It opened on 19 screens and earned $326,494 its opening weekend. It eventually grossed $6,401,297 in the US and $19,598,703 in international markets for a total worldwide box office of $26 million.

Critical response
On Rotten Tomatoes, the film has an approval rating of 78% based on reviews from 36 critics, with an average rating of 6.84/10. The site's consensus states: "Mighty Aphrodite may not stand with Woody Allen's finest work, but it's brought to vivid life by a thoroughly winsome performance from Mira Sorvino." On Metacritic it has a score of 59 out of 100 based on 16 reviews from critics, indicating "mixed or average reviews". Audiences surveyed by CinemaScore gave the film a grade "B+" on scale of A+ to F.

In her review in The New York Times, Janet Maslin said, "Even when it becomes unmistakably lightweight, Mighty Aphrodite remains witty, agile and handsomely made."

Roger Ebert of the Chicago Sun-Times called the film "a sunny comedy" and added, "The movie's closing scene is quietly, sweetly ironic, and the whole movie skirts the pitfalls of cynicism and becomes something the Greeks could never quite manage, a potential tragedy with a happy ending."

In the San Francisco Chronicle, Leah Garchik said the film was "an inventive movie, imaginative and rich in detail" and added, "Woody Allen's incredible wit is at the heart of all that's wonderful in Mighty Aphrodite, and Woody Allen's incredible ego is at the core of its major flaw . . . He fails when he attempts . . . to get the audience to suspend its disbelief and accept Allen, a withered Romeo, as a sweet-natured naif. The crotchety charm of the shy and awkward characters he played as a young man has worn off; nowadays, he comes across as just plain crotchety."

Peter Travers of Rolling Stone said, "The film is a showcase for Sorvino, actor Paul's Harvard-grad daughter, who gives a sensational performance. She shows startling humor and heart without trading on sentiment."

In Variety, Todd McCarthy described the film as "a zippy, frothy confection that emerges as agreeable middle-range Woody . . . There is perhaps a bit too much of the chorus galavanting about delivering their increasingly colloquial admonitions and too few convulsive laughs, but the writer-director has generally pitched the humor at a pleasing and relatively consistent level . . . The film's biggest surprise, and attraction, is Sorvino . . . [who] goes way beyond the whore-with-a-heart-of-gold externals of the part in developing a deeply sympathetic and appealing character. None of the diverse roles she has done to date would have suggested her for this part, but this gutsy performance will put her much more prominently on the map."

Awards and nominations

References

External links

 
 
 
 

1995 films
1995 comedy films
1990s satirical films
1990s sex comedy films
American satirical films
American sex comedy films
1990s English-language films
Erotic fantasy films
Films about prostitution in the United States
Films based on classical mythology
Films directed by Woody Allen
Films featuring a Best Supporting Actress Academy Award-winning performance
Films featuring a Best Supporting Actress Golden Globe-winning performance
Films produced by Letty Aronson
Films produced by Robert Greenhut
Films set in New York City
Films shot in Italy
Films shot in New York City
Films with screenplays by Woody Allen
1990s American films